Runic is a Unicode block containing runic characters.
It was introduced in Unicode 3.0 (1999), with eight additional characters introduced in Unicode 7.0 (2014).
The original encoding of runes in UCS was based on the recommendations of the "ISO Runes Project" submitted in 1997.

The block is intended for the representation of text written in Elder Futhark, Anglo-Saxon runes, Younger Futhark (both in the long-branch and short-twig variants), Scandinavian medieval runes and early modern runic calendars; the additions introduced in version 7.0 in addition allow support of the mode of writing Modern English in Anglo-Saxon runes used by J. R. R. Tolkien, and the special vowel signs used in the Franks Casket inscription.

Background
The distinction made by Unicode between character and glyph variant is somewhat problematic in the case of the runes; the reason is the high degree of variation of letter shapes in historical inscriptions, with many "characters" appearing in highly variant shapes, and many specific shapes taking the role of a number of different characters over the period of runic use (roughly the 3rd to 14th centuries AD).
The division between Elder Futhark, Younger Futhark and Anglo-Saxon runes are well-established and useful categories, but they are connected by a continuum of gradual development, inscriptions using a mixture of older and newer forms of runes, etc. For this reason, the runic Unicode block is of very limited usefulness in representing of historical inscriptions and is better suited for contemporary runic writing than for palaeographic purposes.

The original publication of the Unicode standard is explicitly aware of these problems, and of the compromises necessary regarding the "character / glyph" dichotomy. The charts published show only "idealized reference glyphs", and explicitly delegates the task of creating useful implementations of the standard to font designers, ideally necessitating a separate font for each historical period.
Glyph shape was taken into consideration explicitly for "unification" of an older rune with one of its descendant characters.
On the other hand, the Younger Futhark era script variants of long-branch, and short-twig, in principle a historical instance of "glyph variants", have been encoded separately, while the further variant form of staveless runes has not.

The ISO Runes Project treated the runes as essentially glyph variants of the Latin script. Everson argued that the native futhark ordering is well established, and that it is unusual for UCS to order letters not in Latin alphabetical order rather than according to native tradition, and a corresponding sorting order of the runic letter Unicode characters was adopted for ISO/IEC 14651 in 2001.

Characters
The original 81 characters adopted for Unicode 3.0 included 75 letters, three punctuation marks and three "runic symbols".

The names given to the runic letter characters are "a bit clumsy" in a deliberate compromise between scholarly and amateur requirements.
They list simplified (ASCII) representations of the three names of a "unified" rune in  the Elder Futhark, the Anglo-Saxon and the Younger Futhark traditions, followed by the letter transliterating the rune (if applicable).
The ordering follows the basic futhark sequence, but with (non-unified) variants  inserted after the standard Elder Futhark form of each letter, as follows:

The three "punctuation marks" are three variant forms of separators found in runic inscriptions, one a single dot, one a double dot and one cross-shaped.

The three "runic symbols" are the Arlaug, Tvimadur and Belgthor symbols used exclusively for enumerating years in runic calendars of the early modern period.

The eight additional characters introduced in Unicode 7.0 concern the Anglo-Saxon runes.
Three are variant letters used by J. R. R. Tolkien to write Modern English in Anglo-Saxon runes, representing the English k, oo and sh graphemes.

The five others are letter variants used in one of the Franks Casket inscriptions, "cryptogrammic" replacements for the standard Anglo-Saxon o, i, e, a and æ vowel runes.

Fonts
Numerous Unicode fonts support the Runic block, although most of them are strictly limited to displaying a single glyph per character, often closely modeled on the shape shown in the Unicode block chart.

Free Unicode fonts that support the runic block include: Junicode, GNU FreeFont (in its monospace, bitmap face), Caslon, the serif font Quivira, and Babelstone Runic in its many different formats. Commercial fonts supporting the block include  Alphabetum,  Code2000, Everson Mono, Aboriginal Serif, Aboriginal Sans, Segoe UI Symbol, and TITUS Cyberbit Basic.

Microsoft Windows did not support the Runic block in any of its included fonts during 2000—2008, but with the release of Windows 7 in 2009, the system has been delivered with a font supporting the block, Segoe UI Symbol. In Windows 10 the Runic block was moved into the font Segoe UI Historic.

Chart

History
The following Unicode-related documents record the purpose and process of defining specific characters in the Runic block:

Footnotes

References 

Unicode blocks
Modern runic writing